Winchester Law School was a privately run institution for legal education.  Operated by Henry St. George Tucker Sr., it was open from 1824 to 1831.

History

In 1824 Henry Tucker was named Chancellor of the Equity Court of the Fourth District, with jurisdiction in Clarksburg and Winchester.  Since he had left the Virginia State Senate and a lucrative law practice to accept the judicial appointment, he needed to generate additional income.  Because he had previously worked as a law professor, Tucker decided to start a law school using a building at what is now 37 South Cameron Streer in Winchester.

Using his father St. George Tucker's copies of Blackstone's Commentaries as the basis for his instruction, Henry Tucker lectured three days each week and gave his students regular quizzes to test their knowledge.  In addition, he prepared, edited and published Tucker's Notes on Blackstone's Commentaries for the Use of Students.  Tucker's Commentaries provided the current state and federal law on each point covered by Blackstone, and was widely used because it focused on United States common law rather than English legal and political theory.

The Winchester Law School was a success, largely because of Tucker's favorable reputation as an attorney and law professor.  He had 11 students in the 1824 to 1825 session, and the student body steadily increased until he had over 30 students each term.

Closing
In 1831 Tucker was elected to the Virginia Court of Appeals.  This position required him to relocate to Richmond and necessitated the closing of the Winchester Law School.

Notable alumni
John White Brockenbrough, federal judge and founder of the Washington and Lee University School of Law 
William B. Campbell, member of the United States House of Representatives and Governor of Tennessee 
John R. Chambliss, Sr., wealthy Virginia attorney, planter and member of the Confederate Congress
Robert M. T. Hunter, Speaker of the House, United States Senator from Virginia and Confederate States Secretary of State
William L. Goggin, member of the United States House of Representatives from Virginia 
Zaccheus Collins Lee, attorney and judge in Maryland
Isaac S. Pennybacker, United States Senator from Virginia 
Henry A. Wise, Governor of Virginia

See also
 Burning of Winchester Medical College

References

Law schools in Virginia
1823 establishments in Virginia
1831 disestablishments in the United States
Independent law schools in the United States
Education in Frederick County, Virginia
Defunct law schools